The Sixth Legislative Council of Hong Kong was the sixth meeting of the legislative branch of the Hong Kong Special Administrative Region Government. Running from 1 October 2016 to 31 December 2021, it was the longest legislative session in Hong Kong history, lasted for five years and three months. The term of the session was originally from 1 October 2016 to 30 September 2020, but was extended by the National People's Congress Standing Committee (NPCSC) due to the postponement of the 2020 Legislative Council election.

The membership of the session was based on the results of the 2016 Legislative Council election, where the pro-Beijing camp retained the majority in the council and its flagship party Democratic Alliance for the Betterment and Progress of Hong Kong (DAB) continued to be the largest party. The anti-establishment camp, including the traditional pan-democrats and newly emerging localists secured the majority in the geographical constituencies and the one-third crucial minority which allowed them veto any government's proposal on constitutional reform. Notable new members include the post-Occupy activists, Demosisto's Nathan Law, 23, being the youngest member to be elected and Youngspiration's Yau Wai-ching, 25, being the youngest woman to be elected. Other new members include Eddie Chu, Lau Siu-lai, Sixtus Leung, Eunice Yung and Junius Ho.

The council never met its full membership of 70 members, as two Youngspiration legislators Yau Wai-ching and Sixtus Leung were disqualified by the court on 15 November 2016 over their oath-taking manner at the inauguration of the council. Four more pro-democracy legislators, Leung Kwok-hung, Nathan Law, Lau Siu-lai and Yiu Chung-yim were disqualified for the same reason on 14 July 2017, which left a total six vacant seats of which five of them were filled in the March and November by-elections, won by Vincent Cheng, Gary Fan, Au Nok-hin, Tony Tse and Chan Hoi-yan. Fan and Au were later unseated on 17 December 2019 as the by-election result was ruled as invalid by the court, followed by Chan's departure for the same reason.

In 2019, the Carrie Lam administration's introduction of Fugitive Offenders and Mutual Legal Assistance in Criminal Matters Legislation (Amendment) Bill 2019 sparked an unprecedented clash in the council between the pro-Beijing and pro-democracy legislators, and later turned into a series of historic massive protests. Hundred of protesters stormed the Legislative Council Complex after the annual 1 July march and ransacked and vandalised the interior with anti-government slogans. The continued anti-government protests eventually led to the downfall of the bill on 4 September 2019.

On 31 July 2020, Chief Executive Carrie Lam invoked the Emergency Regulations Ordinance to postpone the September general election for a whole year, citing the resurgence of COVID-19 cases and denying any political calculation to thwart opposition momentum and neutralise the pro-democracy movement. The decision was backed by the NPCSC which in November 2021 disqualified four sitting pro-democracy legislators Alvin Yeung, Kwok Ka-ki, Dennis Kwok and Kenneth Leung on the grounds of the newly imposed national security law, which triggered the mass resignations of the remaining 15 pro-democracy legislators, leaving the council with a total number of 27 vacancies out of 70 seats.

In March 2021 the NPCSC unveiled the drastic electoral overhauls to the Chief Executive and Legislative Council, bypassing the power of constitutional changes vested in the Legislative Council. After the passage of the amendments to Annex I and II of the Basic Law, the Carrie Lam administration tabled the Improving Electoral System (Consolidated Amendments) Bill 2021 which was passed in the pro-Beijing dominated Legislative Council with 40-to-2 vote on 27 May 2021.

Major events

2016–2017

 12 October 2016: In the first meeting of the session, all members took their oaths while three members, Youngspiration's Baggio Leung and Yau Wai-ching and pan-democrat Edward Yiu who inserted their own words into the official script had their oaths rejected by the Legislative Council Secretariat, but 11 others - four localist and seven pan-democratic - added their own wording either before or after taking the oath and face no repercussions. Leung and Yau were criticised for pronouncing China as "Chee-na", the derogatory pronunciation used during the Second Sino-Japanese War and mispronouncing "People's Republic of China" as "people's re-fucking of Chee-na". After the oaths, the second most senior member Leung Yiu-chung of the Neighbourhood and Worker's Service Centre chaired the election of the President of the Legislative Council. To protest the Legislative Council secretariat's decision to disallow the three members to enter the chamber, Leung gave up the role amid calls from his colleagues to postpone the election due to the dispute over the British nationality of the pro-Beijing nominee Andrew Leung of the Business and Professionals Alliance for Hong Kong (BPA). Instead, Abraham Shek of the BPA who replaced Leung Yiu-chung pushed the election ahead. The pan-democrats and localists tore up their ballot papers and exited the meeting room before the vote. As a result, Andrew Leung received 38 votes against pro-democrat nominee James To's zero with three blank ballots.
 19 October 2016: In the second meeting of the session when five members retook their oaths, the pro-Beijing camp staged a walkout to force the meeting to be adjourned for the first time in the session to protest the two Youngspiration legislators refusal to apologise for their "insulting" oaths last week before Yau and Leung, as well as Lau Siu-lai were to retake their oaths.
 26 October 2016: In the third general meeting, Legislative Council President Andrew Leung adjourned the meeting after the three members, two Youngspiration legislators he disallowed from joining the meeting as he decided to delay their oath-retaking but were escorted by the pan-democracy legislators into the chamber, and Civic Passion's Cheng Chung-tai who shouted at Leung for his decision, refused to leave the chamber.

2018–2019

 6 May 2019: After a House Committee meeting with a pro-Beijing majority, voted to issue a set of guidelines to replace the most senior member James To of the Democratic Party with the third senior member Abraham Shek of the Business and Professionals Alliance for Hong Kong to preside the Bills Committee of the controversial Fugitive Offenders and Mutual Legal Assistance in Criminal Matters Legislation (Amendment) Bill 2019 after To was accused of filibustering. To claimed that the move was illegitimate, adding that the secretariat had abused its power in issuing the circular without having any formal discussion. The pro-democracy legislators insisted to go ahead with the 6 May meeting as planned, which was eventually rescheduled by Shek with only 20 members present.
 11 May 2019: A clash broke out as the pro-democracy and pro-Beijing camps called separate meetings of the Bills Committee of the controversial Fugitive Offenders and Mutual Legal Assistance in Criminal Matters Legislation (Amendment) Bill 2019 at the same room. A number of legislators fell to the ground as they pushed and shoved each other along the packed hallway. Gary Fan fell to the ground after standing on a table, and appearing to have fainted before he was sent to hospital.
 12 June 2019: 12 June protest against the extradition bill outside the Legislative Council Complex. 40,000 protesters gathered outside the Government Headquarters attempted and successfully stalled the second reading of the bill, though the Police deployed numerous canisters of tear gas, rubber bullets and bean bag rounds to disperse the protesters. The government and the police characterised the protest as a "riot", marking it the most serious and intense conflict between the police and the protesters during the early stage of the 2019–20 Hong Kong protests.

 1 July 2019: Storming of the Legislative Council Complex where hundreds of protesters broke through the glass walls and metal doors and entered the building, ransacked and vandalised the interior with anti-government slogans. It is considered a watershed event in the 2019–20 protests.

2019–2020
 18 May 2020: After a months-long filibustering by the pro-democrats on the election of the House Committee chair, President Andrew Leung invoked Article 92 of the Rule of Procedures to scrap the duties of Dennis Kwok, the former vice chair of the House Committee who had been presiding the meetings and replaced Chan Kin-por, chair of the Finance Committee who successfully presided the election after the pro-democrat legislators being expelled amid the clashes broke out between the pro-democrats and the security.
 31 July 2020: Chief Executive Carrie Lam announced the postponement of 2020 general election for a whole year.
 11 August 2020: NPCSC passed a decision to extend the incumbent 6th Legislative Council to extend its term for no less than one year, all members of Legco can stay but two decided to resign in protest to the extension.

2020–2021
 11 November 2020: NPCSC passed a decision which led to the disqualification of four sitting legislators by Hong Kong Government, 15 remaining pro-democracy legislators announced their resignation on the same day, with the effective dates ranging from 11 November to 1 December. The Legco has now no effective opposition.

Major legislation

Enacted
 14 June 2018: Guangzhou-Shenzhen-Hong Kong Express Rail Link (Co-location) Bill
 12 June 2020: National Anthem Bill
 12 May 2021: Public Offices (Candidacy and Taking Up Offices)(Miscellaneous Amendments) Bill 2021
 27 May 2021: Improving Electoral System (Consolidated Amendments) Bill 2021

Electoral changes 

After the passage of the National People's Congress Standing Committee (NPCSC) amendment to the Annex I and the Annex II of the Basic Law of Hong Kong on 30 March 2021 to drastically change the existing electoral system of Hong Kong, the Carrie Lam administration began to roll out the local electoral legislation. On 13 April after the Executive Council passed the Improving Electoral System (Consolidated Amendments) Bill 2021, the government unveiled the 765-page bill with more details of the future electoral system. A raft of changes to the Elections (Corrupt and Illegal Conduct) Ordinance was also included legislation to "regulate acts that manipulate or undermine elections", which would criminalise inciting people not to vote or cast blank or spoiled ballots. Violators could face up to three years in prison. The pro-Beijing-dominated Legislative Council voted on the 369 amendments tabled by the government, before passing the bill with 40-to-2 vote on 27 May 2021. The only two opposition legislators, Civic Passion's Cheng Chung-tai said that the overhaul would be a real touchstone of the principle of "Hong Kong people governing Hong Kong", while Pierre Chan for  the Medical constituency said that the new electoral system was a "regression in democracy."

Proposed
 Fugitive Offenders and Mutual Legal Assistance in Criminal Matters Legislation (Amendment) Bill 2019

Composition

Summary

* The Neo Democrats won one seat in the New Territories East by-election, but lost it after a court declared Gary Fan not duly elected.# Resigned en masse with pro-democracy camp.

Change of membership

Graphical representation

Legislative Council of Hong Kong seat composition by party at dissolution.

Non-aligned (1)

Vacant (28)

Pro-Beijing (41)

Leadership

 President: Andrew Leung (BPA)

Convenors
 Pro-Beijing camp: Martin Liao 
 Pro-democracy camp:
 James To (Democratic), 2016–2017
 Charles Mok (PC), 2017–2018
 Claudia Mo (HK First), 2018–2019
 Tanya Chan (Civic), 2019–2020
 Wu Chi-wai (Democratic), 1 October – 1 December 2020
 Vacant, from 1 December 2020

List of members
The following table is a list of LegCo members elected on 4 September 2016 in the order of precedence.

Members who did not serve throughout the term are italicised. New members elected since the general election are noted at the bottom of the page.

Key to changes since legislative election:
a = change in party allegiance
b = by-election
c = did not take seat

Supplementary members

By-elections
 11 March 2018, by-election for Hong Kong Island, Kowloon West, New Territories East and Architectural, Surveying, Planning and Landscape. Au Nok-hin (Independent democrat), Vincent Cheng (DAB), Gary Fan (Neo Democrats), and Tony Tse (pro-Beijing independent) were the winners in the respective constituencies.
 25 November 2018 by-election for Kowloon West. Chan Hoi-yan (nonpartisan, supported by the pro-Beijing camp) was elected to replace independent democrat Lau Siu-lai after she was disqualified in the oath-taking controversy.

Other changes

2016
 Claudia Mo (Kowloon West) announced her resignation from the Civic Party and served under the label of "HK First" on 14 November.

2017
 Michael Tien (New Territories West) announced his resignation from the New People's Party on 10 April and formed his own political group Roundtable.

2018
 Jimmy Ng (Industrial (Second)) joined the Business and Professionals Alliance for Hong Kong (BPA).

Committees

Secretariat
 Secretary General: Kenneth Chen

See also
 2016 Hong Kong legislative election
 2016 President of the Hong Kong Legislative Council election
 2018 Hong Kong by-election
 Hong Kong LegCo members' oath-taking controversy

Notes

References

Terms of the Legislative Council of Hong Kong
2016 Hong Kong legislative election
2016 establishments in Hong Kong
2021 disestablishments in Hong Kong
2020s disestablishments in Hong Kong